Spørteggbreen  is a glacier in the municipality of Luster in Vestland county, Norway. It is the 12th largest glacier in Norway. It lies between the Jostedalsbreen and Harbardsbreen glaciers. The  glacier lies inside Breheimen National Park.

See also
List of glaciers in Norway

References

Glaciers of Vestland
Luster, Norway